Donald Frederick Robinson (c. 1919 – January 9, 1997) was a Canadian politician. He served in the Legislative Assembly of British Columbia from 1956 to 1966, as a Social Credit member for the constituency of Lilloet. He died in Calgary, Alberta in 1997.

References

British Columbia Social Credit Party MLAs
Politicians from Calgary
1910s births
1997 deaths